SM U-90 was a Type U-87 U-boat of the Imperial German Navy during World War I. Its commander Walter Remy made regular stops at remote island North Rona for provisions such as fresh mutton. On 15 May 1918, U-90 shelled the Hirta wireless station in St Kilda, Scotland. On 31 May 1918, U-90 torpedoed and sank , a former Hamburg America Line steamer that had been seized by the United States for troop transportation. From the U.S. Navy crew that abandoned the sinking vessel, U-90 captured Lieutenant Edouard Izac, eventually taking him to Germany. Izac later escaped German captivity and reported to the US Navy about German submarine movements.

U-90 was surrendered to the Allies at Harwich on 20 November 1918 in accordance with the requirements of the Armistice with Germany, and later laid up at Pembroke. She was to be loaned to Belgium, and was en route there in tow from Pembroke when she foundered off the Isle of Wight on 29 November 1919.

Design
German Type U 87 submarines were preceded by the shorter Type U 81 submarines. U-90 had a displacement of  when at the surface and  while submerged. The submarine was powered by two  engines for use while surfaced, and two  engines for use while submerged. She had two propeller shafts.

U-90 was fitted with four  torpedo tubes (two at the bow and two at the stern), ten to twelve torpedoes, and one  deck gun. She had a complement of thirty-six (thirty-two crew members and four officers).

Summary of raiding history

References

Notes

Citations

Bibliography

World War I submarines of Germany
German Type U 87 submarines
Ships built in Danzig
1917 ships
U-boats commissioned in 1917